MV Lina was a freight ferry owned by El Salam Maritime and was scrapped in 2006 in India, the ship was formerly the European Trader with Townsend Thoresen.

References

External links
MV European Trader, Past and Present

Ferries of Panama
Ferries of the United Kingdom
1975 ships